Eusebio Prieto y Ruiz  was a nineteenth-century Costa Rican politician.

Costa Rican politicians
Year of birth missing
Year of death missing
Supreme Court of Justice of Costa Rica judges